Confessions of a Thug is a 2005 American rap "hip hop" opera film.  It is directed by Daron Fordham and is the film debut performance for Lady of Rage.

Synopsis
The film is the story of South Boy (Daron Fordham). He learns about the criminal underworld from his mentor a retired mob boss (John Martino), who is also the closest thing to a father figure he has known. Determined to find the family he never knew and become a feared and respected gang-lord, he must deal with snitches, government agents and scheming associates through his drug deals, relationships, and life in general. South Boy gets pulled in deep in this inner city exploitation on urban gangs and he is on a journey to reclaim what is rightfully his and to also set everything right.

Cast
Ben Affan - Miguel
Karina Bonnefil - Quadra
Victoria Bowers - 
Ashley Buckhalter - 
Georgia Chris - Lisa
John Early - Morgan
Kenny Flyy - Roscoe
Raymond Forchion - Himself - Producer Commentary
Daron Fordham - South Boy
Khris Gibston - Flamboyant Gay Inmate
John Hill - FBI Agent #2
Lanre Idewu - Risk
Valerie Jones - Caberra
Kristia Knowles - Mother
Shealyn Taylor - Little Girl 
The Lady of Rage - 
Leslie Lormann - Federal Agent
Bryan Lugo - Carlos
Vinicius Machado - Hector
Aaliyah Madyun - Yayla
J. Martino - 	
John Martino - Vic Torino
Sandra Milliner - Rosie
J.T. Money - 	
Wiley B. Oscar - Lonnie
Michael A. Quill - Warden Chambers
John G. Rice Jr. - F.B.I. Agent #3
Amy Simon - Ms. Stanton
Alvetta Smith - Skyy
Angel Tyree - 	
Lithia Velasquez - Vic's Nurse
Vincent Ward - Mr. Redd Dog
Brewier Welch - FBI Agent #1

Production
While the film is shot with a lower budget, it pulls off some realistic story lines, as well as the creative elements of the movie when the characters spontaneously burst into Hip-Hop song, expressing the inner thoughts of the characters through rap. The movie was shot in mostly in Florida, Georgia and the Bahamas, and was picked up by Polychrome Pictures and Warner Brothers. The production dates began on 1 September 2003. The working title was Fed Time

Awards
Directed by Daron Fordham and produced by Raymond Forchion, the movie won Fordham the Best Direction award at the San Diego Black Film Festival and was also screened as an Official Selection of the URBANWORLD/VIBE Film Festival in New York. In 2006, the film also won two Crystal Reels at the Crystal Reel Awards, one for John Martino in the category of Best Actor, and the other also for Martino for Best Actor in a Feature Film.

References

External links
Confessions of a Thug at IMDB
Official Website

2005 films
American musical films
2000s musical films
2000s English-language films
2000s American films